Karen Hill is a Canadian television producer, television writer and story editor. Her credits include Sophie, Blue Murder, Show Me Yours and the film Expecting for which she was nominated for a Canadian Comedy Award in 2004 for Pretty Funny Writing.

External links 
 

Canadian television producers
Canadian women television producers
Canadian television writers
Living people
Canadian women television writers
Place of birth missing (living people)
Year of birth missing (living people)
Canadian women screenwriters